Heimbach is a town in the district of Düren of the state of North Rhine-Westphalia, Germany. It is located on the river Rur, in the Eifel hills, approx. 20 km south of Düren. Heimbach has the smallest population of any town in North Rhine-Westphalia. 

The districts of the city are Blens (290 residents), Düttling (80 residents), Hasenfeld (1200 residents), Hausen (290 residents), Hergarten (600 residents) and Vlatten (1000 residents), which prior to 1972 were villages with their own administration. Between Hausen and Hergarten lies the hamlet of Walbig, and between Hasenfeld and Schmidt (City of Nideggen) is the hamlet of Buschfelder Hof, which formerly belonged to Blens.

History 

Heimbach and the city's Hengebach Castle was the seat of the local noble family which inherited the County of Jülich in 1207, with Heimbach annexed to the County (later the Duchy) since 1237.

After the fire of 1687 the city of Heimbach was rebuilt to house the town's population; however, the castle of Hengebach was left a ruin until 1904 when restoration work began. Now restored, the castle is owned and operated as a tourist attraction by the city of Heimbach. The castle is located on a rocky outcrop in the middle of Heimbach. Today it is used as a restaurant and a location for public events. There are also castles in the villages of Blens, Hausen and Vlatten, now part of Heimbach.

Tourism 
Heimbach is an important town for pilgrims who visit the monastery of Mariawald and the statue of Mary in the church of Heimbach.

Heimbach is a popular town for tourists, particularly on day trips from the nearby cities of Cologne, Aachen and Düsseldorf but also from the Netherlands. The main attractions are the Eifel National Park, the Art Nouveau power station, the Rur dam, the monastery of Mariawald and the Hengebach castle. The renowned Spannungen chamber music concerts, founded by Lars Vogt, which take place in the power station are also popular and have attracted musicians such as Sharon Cam and Sabine Meyer.

The villages of Hausen and Blens, located in northern Heimbach, provide great views of rocky outcrops which are now part of a nature conservancy area. One of the many campgrounds around Heimbach lies in the shadow of these rocks.

Demographics 
Most residents of Heimbach are Roman Catholics, attending the churches in Heimbach (St. Clemens), Hausen (St. Nikolaus), Vlatten (St. Dinysius) and Hergarten (St. Martin) and chapels in Blens (St. Georg), Hasenfeld (St. Nepomuk), Düttling (St. Apollonia) and Vlatten (St. Michael).

Politics

The Mayor of Heimbach is Jochen Weiler (CDU), elected in 2020. The Council of Heimbach contains 9 members of the Christian Democratic Union, 5 members of the SPD, one member of the Green Party, 2 members of the FDP, 2 members of the UWV and one member of the AfD.

Notable people 

 Johann Peter Schroeder (1794–1876), politician

 Georg Frentzen (1854–1923), architect and university lecturer; built the Kraftwerk Heimbach (hydroelectric power plant of the Urfttalsperre) in Heimbach-Hasenfeld in 1904
 Franz Binz (1896–1965), Reichstag deputy of the NSDAP, lived in Heimbach
 Luise Kött-Gärtner (born 1953), sculptural artist
 Stephan Meyer (born 1947), director, lives from time to time in Heimbach

References

Düren (district)
Districts of the Rhine Province